Protactinium(V) chloride is the chemical compound composed of protactinium and chlorine with the formula PaCl5. It forms yellow monoclinic crystals and has a unique structure composed of chains of 7 coordinate, pentagonal bipyramidal, protactinium atoms sharing edges.

Protactinium(V) chloride can react with boron tribromide at high temperatures to form protactinium(V) bromide. It also reacts with fluorine to form protactinium(V) fluoride at high tempatures.

See also
 Protactinium(IV) chloride

References

Protactinium compounds
Chlorides
Actinide halides